The Black Register is a political party in Denmark. The party supports lower taxes and fees.

History
The party was founded in 2011 by Ole Eli Christiansen. Since 2007, had Christiansen run a register, named Politiet Dummer Sig, of police officers. This register listed police officers that he and other civilians had been unhappy with. In 2011 he then founded the Black Register, expanding the register to include lawyers, psychologists, etc.

References

Political parties in Denmark
Political parties established in 2011
2011 establishments in Denmark